Giovanni Battista Dordoni or Dordone (died 1599) was an Italian painter active in Castelleone.

Biography
Dordoni painted the frescoes depicting Christ and the Apostles in the Sanctuary of the Misericordia in Castelleone. In 1588 he painted the clock face in the Torrazzo in Cremona. One of his pupils was the sculptor Francesco Gritto, called Mombello, also native of Castelleone.

References

16th-century births
16th-century deaths
16th-century Italian painters
Italian male painters
Painters from Cremona